Dalit music or Bahujan music is music created, produced, or inspired by Bahujans and Dalits (Shudras), people often discriminated against on the basis of caste, including Dalit rock, Bhim rap and Dalit pop as well as the music genres of the Ravidasis, including Chamar pop, Bhim Palana, Bhim geet and Punjabi Ambedkarite music.

Background
Music is a monumental part of Dalits as it is expression of their protest, folk tales and assertion. In Maharashtra, Dalit shahirs the singers and writers mostly creating content of Ambedkarite ideology and against caste oppression.

In Nepal, Dalit musicians are known as Naumati Baaja musicians. In Punjab, Chamar pop movement was started by Kanshi Ram to popularize the BAMCEF launched in 1978. In Tamil Nadu, Parais are used by dalits to express through music.

Artists

 The Casteless Collective
 Amar Singh Chamkila, Punjabi singer, songwriter, musician, performer and composer.
 Hans Raj Hans, Punjabi folk and sufi singer, M.P of North West Delhi 
 Navraj Hans, Punjabi singer, actor, entrepreneur and performer
 Yuvraj Hans, Punjabi singer and actor
 Jitendra Haripal, Sambalpuri folk singer
 Kaka, Punjabi Dalit Singer
 Kanth Kaler, Punjabi folk singer
 Kishore Kumar 'Pagla'
 Ginni Mahi, Punjabi folk singer, rapper and stage performer 
 Mooralala Marwada, Sufi folk singer
 Daler Mehndi, Punjabi Dalit singer
 Mukund Nayak, folk singer, songwriter and Jhumair dancer.
 Nandlal Nayak, folk artist, music composer and Nagpuri film director.
 Miss Pooja, Punjabi Bhangra artist and singer
 Manjit Rupowalia, Punjabi singer
 Sumeet Samos, rapper and singer
 Sheetal Sathe, folk singer, poet, and Dalit rights activist

See also
 Mirasi
 Dalit literature
 Chamar
 Black music
 Dalit

References

Further reading
Sherinian, Zoe C. Tamil Folk Music as Dalit Liberation Theology (2014)

Music by ethnicity
Musician castes
Dalit artists
Traditional music
Popular music
Dalit communities